Leo McAuliffe (1933-2018) was an international speedway rider from Wales.

Biography
McAuliffe was born in 1933 in the village of Clydach near Swansea. In 1948 he moved to Pontardawe and appeared in court following a motorcycle offence where the magistrate suggested that he find an appropriate place for his motorcycling. After moving to London he began training at Rye House and gained his first contract with Eastbourne Eagles and later became a protege of fellow Welshman Freddie Williams.

He went on to ride in the top tier of British Speedway for various clubs. His greatest moment came when he reached the final of the Speedway World Championship in the 1963 Individual Speedway World Championship. He was capped by Great Britain just once.

World final appearances

Individual World Championship
 1963 -  London, Wembley Stadium - 8th - 7pts

References 

1933 births
2018 deaths
British speedway riders
Welsh speedway riders
Welsh motorcycle racers
Birmingham Brummies riders
Belle Vue Aces riders
Cradley Heathens riders
Eastbourne Eagles riders
New Cross Rangers riders
Oxford Cheetahs riders
Rayleigh Rockets riders
Southampton Saints riders
Swindon Robins riders
Wimbledon Dons riders